For Crying Out Loud may refer to:

 For Crying Out Loud (album), a 2017 album by Kasabian
 "For Crying Out Loud" (song), a 1991 song by Davis Daniel
 "For Crying Out Loud", song by The 77s from Drowning with Land in Sight  
 "For Crying Out Loud", song by Anita Cochran
 "For Crying Out Loud", song by Meat Loaf from Bat Out of Hell
 For Crying Out Loud, 1950s stage show with Irene Champlin

See also
 "Crying Out Loud", an episode of Modern Family